Martin Dobson (born 14 February 1948; Rishton) popularly known as Dobbo is a former professional footballer and England international who played as a midfielder. He was the first player to be transferred for £300,000 when Everton bought him from Burnley in August 1974.

He was born in Rishton and attended Clitheroe Royal Grammar School. He was signed as youngster by Bolton Wanderers who spotted him playing for Lancashire Grammar Schools. However he was given a free transfer and moved on to Burnley. He had a long and successful playing career, playing for almost 20 years and totalling over 600 league appearances while playing for Burnley, Everton and Bury. He won 5 England caps overall, 4 while at Burnley and 1 at Everton. His first England cap was given to him on 3 April 1974 in a 0–0 draw against Portugal by manager Sir Alf Ramsey because of FA Cup commitments of other players. However, he impressed enough to win 4 more caps throughout the year.

As well as finishing his playing career with Bury, Dobson became their manager until 1989. During this period they were promoted from the old Fourth Division and became an established Third Division side.

Dobson was appointed manager of Bristol Rovers in July 1991, however he was sacked after only 12 games in charge in October of the same year. On 10 January 2010 he was appointed joint caretaker manager of Premier League side and former club Burnley, with Terry Pashley, after Owen Coyle left the club for Bolton Wanderers. However, Dobson and Pashley never managed a game due to the rapid appointment of Brian Laws.

Brian Laws, the Burnley manager at the time kept Dobson on his coaching staff in the short-term as he built up his backroom staff. Dobson had then returned full-time to his role of Director of Youth Development at Burnley.

Dobson left his post as director of Youth at Burnley in October 2011 after his contract was not renewed by manager Eddie Howe instead appointing his reserve team manager Jason Blake, from former club AFC Bournemouth, as academy manager. He became the Professional Development Co-ordinator at Everton, in February 2018.

Manager stats

External links
Profile at EnglandFC.com

References

1948 births
Living people
English footballers
England international footballers
England under-23 international footballers
Bolton Wanderers F.C. players
Bolton Wanderers F.C. non-playing staff
Everton F.C. players
Burnley F.C. players
Bury F.C. players
Bristol Rovers F.C. managers
Northwich Victoria F.C. managers
People from Rishton
Association football midfielders
English Football League players
English Football League representative players
English football managers
Bury F.C. managers
Burnley F.C. non-playing staff
Everton F.C. non-playing staff